Castelli is a town in Buenos Aires Province, Argentina. It is the administrative centre for Castelli Partido.

External links

 Municipal website

Populated places in Buenos Aires Province